Best of Benassi Bros. is a best of/greatest hits album released by Benassi Bros in 2005. There are two versions of the album, one released in France and the other released in Germany a year later.

2005 Track listing

2006 Track listing

Benassi Bros. albums
2005 greatest hits albums